Men Opening Umbrellas Ahead is the 1974 debut solo album by the very English musician, writer, poet and comedian Vivian Stanshall.

Releases
The initial LP pressing was deleted by Warner Bros. Records soon after release, having sold only the initial vinyl pressing of 5,000 copies. The album remained out of print for over 35 years.

In 2010, an unauthorized CD reissue was made available by Harkit Records. The CD featured notes by Dutch dada-ist Freek Kinkelaar and featured two bonus tracks not on the original LP: "Baba Tunde" and "Lakonga". This edition is sourced from a vinyl copy and is a "bootleg" not authorized by the Stanshall estate. The bonus tracks come from a rare 1974 single.

Poppydisc Records released a remastered edition, on LP and CD, on 21 May 2012. These are the first re-issues to be authorized by the artist's estate, with a note in CD booklet stating (in bold uppercase) "Do not buy the Harkit Records CD as it is a poor quality bootleg, unauthorized by the Stanshall family". The remastered CD contains the two bonus tracks, while the vinyl version is the same as the original vinyl LP.

Track listing 
All songs written and arranged by Vivian Stanshall, except where noted:

Side 1 
 "Afoju Ti Ole Riran (Dead Eyes)" (Vivian Stanshall, Gaspar Lawal)
 "Truck-Track"
 "Yelp, Bellow, Rasp Et Cetera"
 "Prong"
 "Redeye"

Side 2 
 "How The Zebra Got His Spots"
 "Dwarf Succulents"
 "Bout of Sobriety"
 "Prong & Toots Go Steady"
 "Strange Tongues"

Bonus tracks on 2010 and 2012 CD reissues 
 "Lakonga" (single A-side)
 "Baba Tunde" (single B-side)
(Both tracks written by Stanshall and Lawal)

Personnel
Vivian Stanshall - vocals, recorder, euphonium, ukulele, Chelonian pipes 
Anthony "Bubs" White - electric guitar 
Steve Winwood - bass guitar, organ 
Gasper Lawal - talking drums, congas, xylophone, drum kit ("How The Zebra Got His Spots") 
Neil Innes - piano, slide guitar,  organ ("How The Zebra Got His Spots") 
Jim Capaldi - drum kit, lesser log 
Deryk Quinn - cabassa, Nigerian coffee tables, greater log 
Ric Grech - violin 
Rebop Kwaku Baah - congas ("Prong & Toots")
Doris Troy, Madeline Bell, Barry St. John - backing vocals
Ayus Ape, Gani, Gasper Lawal - male Yoruba chorus 
unidentified West Indian taxi driver - bass guitar ("Lakonga" and "Baba Tunde")
unidentified West Indian taxi driver's friend - drum kit ("Lakonga" and "Baba Tunde")

References

External links
Men Opening Umbrellas page on Ginger Geezer website

1974 debut albums
Vivian Stanshall albums
Warner Records albums